James Leonard may refer to:

 Bobo Leonard (James Leonard), American Negro League baseball player
 James Leonard, co-host of The Two Norries podcast
 James Leonard, one of the co-proprietors of the Beverly Cotton Manufactory
 James A. Leonard (1841–1862), American chess master
 James C. Leonard (1825–1891), Congregationalist minister in Australia
 James E. Leonard, Chief of Department for the New York City Fire Department
 James F. Leonard (1920-2020), United States Ambassador to the United Nations
 James Weston Leonard (1853–1909), politician of southern Africa
 Jim Leonard (1910–1993), American football player
 Jim Leonard (photographer) (1950–2014), storm chaser, photographer and videographer
 Jim Leonard (American football) (1899–1978), American football lineman
 Jimmy Leonard (born 1927), Irish politician

See also
 Jim Leonhard (born 1982), American football player